Jiangtai Area is an area and township on the northern portion of  Chaoyang District, Beijing, China. It borders Wangjing, Jiuxianqiao Subdistricts and Cuigezhuang Township to the north, Dongba Township to the east, Jiuxianqiao, Maizidian Subdistricts and Dongfeng Township to the south, and Taiyanggong Township to the west. In 2020, it has a total population of 53,714.

The township got its name Jiangtai from the site of former ritual stage found in the region. It was used in a ceremony to officially promote generals during the 4th century.

History

Administrative Divisions 
As of 2021, there are a total of 13 subdivisions under Jiangtai, in which 11 were communities and 2 were villages:

See also 
 List of township-level divisions of Beijing

References

Chaoyang District, Beijing
Areas of Beijing